Sage Steele Kimzey  (born August 26, 1994) is an American professional rodeo cowboy who specializes in bull riding. He competes on the Professional Rodeo Cowboys Association (PRCA) circuit and has won seven PRCA bull riding world championships. He was also a three-time world champion of the now-defunct Championship Bull Riding (CBR) organization. Kimzey is working on breaking Don Gay's record of eight PRCA bull riding world titles.

Early life 
Sage Steele Kimzey was born on August 26, 1994, in Strong City, Oklahoma. His father, Ted, was a PRCA barrelman who also worked at the National Finals Rodeo (NFR) in 1980 and 1987. His mother, Jennifer, is the CEO of Gold Buckle Realty. His older sister, Dusta, is a pharmacist, and his younger brother Trey followed in his footsteps by becoming a bull rider as well. His mother and siblings sideline as trick riders. Kimzey graduated from Cheyenne High School in Oklahoma. He played basketball there for four years. His team won the state championship in his senior year. He attended Southwestern Oklahoma State University (Weatherford).

Career highlights
These are the highlights from each PRCA season for Kimzey.

2013 season 
He won the Rangers Rodeo in Lawton, Oklahoma, with a 93-point ride on D&H Cattle's No. 43x; the Chisholm Trail Stampede in Duncan, Oklahoma; and the Crosstie PRCA Rodeo in Hinton, Oklahoma. He won the Land Rush Pro Rodeo in Beggs, Oklahoma; the Kit Carson County Fair & Rodeo in Burlington, Colorado; and the Area Chamber of Commerce Fourth of July Rodeo in Belton, Texas. He won the Mesquite ProRodeo Series in Mesquite, Texas, on June 21 and July 5; and the MH Henry Pro Rodeo in Bowie, Texas, on Sept. 14 and Sept. 15. He won co-champion at the Topeka PRCA Rodeo in Topeka, Kansas; and the Jayhawker Roundup Rodeo in Hill City, Kansas. He set a PRCA record for most money won on a permit in a single season with $47,726.

2014 season 
He won the San Antonio Stock Show & Rodeo in San Antonio, Texas; the San Antonio Xtreme Bulls, also in San Antonio, Texas; and the All-American ProRodeo Finals in Waco, Texas. He won the New Mexico State Fair & Rodeo in Albuquerque, New Mexico; the Central Wyoming Fair & PRCA Rodeo in Casper, Wyoming; and the Elks Rodeo in Woodward, Oklahoma. He won the Tulsa State Fair PRCA Rodeo in Tulsa, Oklahoma; the Chisholm Trail Stampede in Duncan, Oklahoma; and the Will Rogers Stampede in Claremore, Oklahoma. He won the Spokane Interstate Rodeo in Spokane, Washington; the Southwestern International PRCA Rodeo in El Paso, Texas; and the Kitsap Stampede Division 2 Xtreme Bulls in Bremerton, Washington/ He won the Division 2 Qualifying Xtreme Bulls Event in Oklahoma City, Oklahoma; and the Gem State Classic ProRodeo Series in Blackfoot, Idaho. He was co-champion at the Xtreme Bulls Tour Finale in Ellensburg, Washington; the Guymon Pioneer Days Rodeo in Guymon, Oklahoma; the Rapid City Rodeo Wrangler Champions Challenge in Rapid City, South Dakota; and the Nacogdoches Pro Rodeo & Steer Show in Nacogdoches, Texas.

At the NFR, he won four rounds. He won the average title. He became the second rookie to win a bull riding gold buckle. His total NFR earnings of $175,466 was the highest of the event, giving him the Ram Truck Top Gun Award. He finished with a rookie record total of $318,631. The record could be any event or a combined amount. By winning this championship during his first two years, he became the first competitor to do so as a card carrying holder in the PRCA.

2015 season 
He won the Ellensburg Rodeo in Ellensburg, Washington; the Xtreme Bulls Tour Finale, also in Ellensburg, Washington; the Pendleton Round-Up in Pendleton, Oregon; and the Wrangler Champions Challenge Finale in Omaha, Nebraska. He won the Wrangler Champions Challenges in Logandale, Nevada and Redding, California; and the Spanish Fork Fiesta Days Rodeo in Spanish Fork, Utah. He won the Rangers Rodeo in Lawton, Oklahoma; the Gooding Pro Rodeo in Gooding, Idaho; the Range Days Rodeo in Rapid City, South Dakota; and the Cassia County Fair & Rodeo in Burley, Idaho. He won the Pasadena Livestock Show & Rodeo in Pasadena, Texas; and the Division 2 Qualifying Xtreme Bulls Event in Oklahoma City, Oklahoma. He was the co-champion at the Guymon Pioneer Days Rodeo in Guymon, Oklahoma and the Cattleman Days Rodeo in Ashland, Missouri.

He placed in seven rounds at the NFR. He finished second in the average. He won his second world championship in a row with $327,178. Kimzey came into the NFR with a very large lead, having had a very successful regular season. At finals, he drew some tough bulls. His rides were not as successful as he wanted. However, his successful regular season covered that. He rode six bulls. Still, the bulls he did and did not ride cost him money. The championship came down to the finish. He managed to ride well enough to win.

2016 season 
He won the San Antonio Stock Show & Rodeo in San Antonio, Texas; the Pendleton Round-Up in Pendleton, Oregon; and the Sikeston Jaycee Bootheel Rodeo in Sikeston, Missouri. He won the Ogden Pioneer Days in Ogden, Utah; the Molalla Buckeroo Rodeo in Molalla, Oregon; and the Kansas' Biggest Rodeo in Phillipsburg, Kansas. He won the Wrangler Champions Challenges in Spanish Fork, Utah and Pueblo, Colorado; the Cody Stampede Rodeo in Cody, Wyoming and the Cody Stampede Wrangler Champions Challenge. He won the 40th Annual Isanti, Minnesota Firefighters Rodeo; the Sidney, and the Iowa's Championship Rodeo in Sidney, Iowa; He won co-champion at the Horse Heaven Round-up Wranglers Champions Challenge in Kennewick, Washington; and the Wild Bill Hickok Rodeo in Abilene, Kansas.

At the NFR, he won Round 1. He placed in five rounds to rank third. He won his third consecutive world championship with $311,462 in earnings.

He rode Aftershock from Frontier Rodeo in the first round and scored 86.50 points. He was second in Round 3 once he rode Night Moves from Calgary Stampede with a score of 87.50. He covered his bull in the fifth round, but did not win any money. He split second and third in Round 6 with a score of 87.50 on Half Nuts, from Pete Carr Rodeo. In Round 7, he split a score of 79, for fifth place, with a bull named Long Haired Outlaw. Outlaw was a bull from New West Rodeo. In the tenth and final round, he rode the Lancaster & Jones bull Total Bulls Battle Born earning an 83-point score which clinched the world championship. Kimzey had now entered the record books winning three world titles in a row in his first three years as a card holder. Another thing Kimzey had managed was too stay relatively injury-free except for minor injuries.

2017 season 
He won the Days of '47 Cowboy Games and Rodeo in Salt Lake City, Utah; the K-Days Rodeo in Edmonton, Alberta; the Ellensburg Rodeo in Ellensburg, Washington and the Walker County Fair & Rodeo in Huntsville, Texas. He won the SWELS-Xtreme Bulls in Fort Worth, Texas; the Crystal Springs Rodeo Xtreme Bulls in Clear Lake, South Dakota; and the Lea County Fair & PRCA Rodeo Xtreme Bulls in Lovington, New Mexico. He won the Bell County PRCA Rodeo in Belton, Texas; Rodeo Killeen in Killeen, Texas; and the Mandan Rodeo Days Xtreme Bulls in Mandan, North Dakota. He won the Wild, Wild West ProRodeo in Silver City, New Mexico; the Red Desert Roundup in Rock Springs, Wyoming; the Wind River PRCA Rodeo Roundup in Riverton, Wyoming; and the Crossett Riding Club 68th Annual PRCA Rodeo in Crossett, Arkansas; He was co-champion at the Redding Rodeo in Redding, California.

At the NFR, he won Rounds 5 and 10. He split the win in Round 3. He placed in five rounds. He finished first in the average with 601.5 points on seven head. He finished the year ranked first in the world standings. His earnings for the NFR were $436,479.

For two years in a row, Kimzey did things no other bull rider had done. He won his fourth world title in his fourth attempt. He rode 4L & Diamond S Rodeo's Girl Money for an 88-point score to win Round 10 and win the gold buckle in front of 16,954 people. He was now halfway to tying Don Gay's record. He said he's halfway up the mountain and each step is special. Usually by now he had a healthy lead. However, this year he had some injuries, but got things going in the spring. Kimzey also won the NFR average title this year. He had 601.5 points on seven head. Kimzey became the only bull rider to break $400,00 in earnings in a single season. He won $192,134 at the finals to give him a total of $436,479, breaking his own record of $327,178 in 2015."I don't see any reaon not to win nine or 10 in a row", Kimzey said. "I've got the talent and drive and abiity, and the Lord has blessed me in ways I can't imagine."

2018 season 
He won the San Antonio Stock Show & Rodeo Xtreme Bulls in San Antonio, Texas; the Ellensburg Washington Rodeo Xtreme Bulls Tour Finale in Ellensburg, Washington; and the Rodeo Austin in Austin, Texas. He won the National Circuit Finals Rodeo in Kissimmee, Florida; the All-American ProRodeo Finals in Waco, Texas; the Strathmore Stampede in Strathmore, Alberta and the Livingston Roundup in Livingston, Montana. He won the Greeley Stampede in Greeley, Colorado; the Colorado State Fair & Rodeo in Pueblo, Colorado and the Fort Mohave Classic PRCA Xtreme Bulls in Fort Mohave, Arizona. He won the Butterfield Stage Days PRCA Rodeo in Bridgeport,Texas; the Licking PRCA Rodeo in Licking, Missouri; the Wind River PRCA Rodeo Roundup in Riverton, Wyoming; the Division 2 Qualifying Event Xtreme Bulls in Oklahoma City, Oklahoma. He won the Sanders County Fair & PRCA Rodeo in Plains, Montana; and the Comal County Fair & Rodeo in New Braunfels, Texas; and the River City Rodeo in Omaha, Nebraska. He also won co-champion at the Mountain Valley Stampede in Heber City, Utah; the Gladewater Round-Up Xtreme Bulls in Gladewater, Texas; and the Crockett Lions Club PRCA Rodeo in Crockett, Texas.

At the NFR, he won Round 10. He split the win in Round 3. He placed in four rounds. He came in fifth in the average. He finished with 347 points on four head. He finished at the top of the world standings five years in a row. His total NFR earnings were $415,263.

Kimzey came into the NFR with a huge lead this time. He had started out his season with a broken pelvis. He also suffered other injuries during the year. He only got 4 qualified rides during the 10 rounds. However, in the 10th round, he had the highest score event, a 93-point score on Record Rack's Shootin' Stars, owned by Beutler & Son Rodeo.

This championship round tied Kimzey with Jim Shoulders record of five consecutive world titles. The difference was that Shoulders won his titles before the NFR existed, so Kimzey holds the record for the NFR. He made $415,263 for the year.

2019 season 
In mid-July, Kimzey was facing the final round at the Calgary Stampede with three other competitors. It was time for the draw. One of the bulls was Night Moves. In 2017, Kimzey had ridden this bull for 91 points at the final round of the Calgary Stampede. He had matched up with this bull three times total. Night moves had bucked him off in 2016 at the Calgary Stampede. Kimzey had ridden the bull another time at the 2016 NFR for 87.5 points. After the others drew their bulls, he was left with Night Moves to have the bull who had helped him earn two titles before. Kimzey rode the bull for a new high score, 92.5 points. His celebration afterwards was clear to all. Kimzey rode that day to a total winning of the event; he has become the first bull rider to win the Calgary Stampede three times.

He won the Reno Rodeo in Reno, Nevada. He won the Pendleton Round-Up in Pendleton, Oregon; the Wainwright Stampede in Wainwright, Alberta; the Wharton County Youth Fair & Exposition Xtreme Bulls in Wharton, Texas; and the Helotes Festival Association Rodeo, also in Wharton, Texas. He also won A Night at the Ranch Bull Riding in Innisfail, Alberta; the Rocky Pro Rodeo in Rocky Mountain House, Alberta; the Mandan Rodeo Days in Mandan, North Dakota and Kansas' Biggest Rodeo in Phillipsburg, Kansas. He won the Kitsap Stampede Xtreme Bulls in Bremerton, Washington; and the Tri-State Rodeo Cinch Shoot-Out in Fort Madison, Iowa. He became the co-champion at the Alberta Black Gold Pro Rodeo in Leduc, Alberta; the Lea Park Rodeo in Marwayne, Alberta; the XIT Rodeo & Reunion in Dalhart, Texas; and the Strathmore Stampede in Strathmore, Alberta.

At the NFR, he won Rounds 7 and 8. He placed in eight rounds. He won his sixth consecutive bull riding world championship, and his third average title. He won a record NFR earnings of $235,359 (includes ground money). He finished at the top of the world standings with another record, $480,797 (including ground money).

This NFR saw individuals making strides in almost every event. The least amount required to qualify for the NFR was $100,000 in winnings. As usual though, the top 15 got through the door. Round 1 belonged to Stetson Wright and Boudreaux Campbell. Round 2 found Kimzey a second place check while Campbell again finished in the top three. Round 4 showed up Wright and Campbell earning big checks again. Round 5 Kimzey was back earning more money. In Round 6, Campbell was still around and Kimzey collected another paycheck. In Round 7, it was quite a match. Kimzey got a 90-point ride. He essentially won the world championship after that by collecting another big check. Campbell was still climbing up the standings. In round 8, he put another stamp on the championship. Campbell was still determined and Wright was holding second in the all-around race and adding more money to his bull riding total. In Round 9, any shot for No. 1 was definitely gone, but the rest were still available. Others were doing their best to get a spot. During Round 10, the world championship was decided. Jordan Hansen decided to end the finals by winning round seven. Kimzey finished off his Round Ten with a second-place finish. Kimzey was now only two world championships away from tying Don Gay. Wright's determination brought him the All-Around world title.

Winning this world title NFR tied Kimzey with Jim Shoulders' record. They have both won six consecutive bull riding world championships. Shoulders won 7 titles, but only won 6 in a row from 1954 to 1959. Kimzey needed to win one more title to tie Shoulders for number of titles won.

2020 season 
He won the Herriman City Xtreme Bulls in Herriman, Utah; and the Gooding Pro Rodeo in Gooding, Idaho. He was the co-champion at the Iron County Fair and PRCA Rodeo in Parowan, Utah and the co-champion at the The American Rodeo in Arlington, Texas.

As of September 30, Kimzey was sitting at No. 1 in the world standings with earnings of $92,334.12. Kimzey had earned over $2 million to date. He had won six world championships in a row. He was barely $3,000 over the No. 2 Ky Hamilton. Kimzey credited his youth as part of his inspiration. "Just growing up in this kind of environment and getting to hang around world champions all the time, even when I was growing up as a little bitty kid… it really lit a fire under me and made me want to be a professional rodeo cowboy that much more." His brother Trey started competing his first full season in 2019, and they could often be seen vying for the same No. 1 spot at rodeos around the country.

In the NFR, in Round 10, he split the win. He placed in four other rounds. He finished sixth in the average. His earnings in the NFR were $92,764.

2021 season 
On July 9, Kimzey and Parker McCown split the win at the Dinosaur Roundup Rodeo in Vernal, Utah. They both won with 90.5-point rides. Kimzey had competed there a few times before, but never made any headway there. He drew Audacious from Powder River Rodeo this time. This bull had been a money bull for the stock contractors for a few years. He was actually even better this year. Kimzey knew he had a good chance to change things on this bull. He had ridden this bull in the past to the pay window at the 2019 San Antonio Stock Show & Rodeo. Daylon Swearigen recently rode him to a 90-point ride.

On August 22, Kimzey won the Yellowstone River Round-Up in Billings, Montana. He was matched up against Sankey Pro Rodeo and Phenom Genetics' bull Lil Man as the next to last ride of the night. Only one possible re-ride was remaining. Kimzey conquered the bull with a score of 90 points. It became the only qualified ride of the evening. After three days, during MontanaFair's rodeo, he won the Yellowstone River Round-Up bull riding championship. Kimzey took in $25,500 in prize money. "It feels really good", Kimzey told The Billings Gazette and 406mtsports.com moments after the ride. "I had a really good bull to give me a chance to win."

He won the Cactus Jack Xtreme Bull Riding in Uvalde, Texas; He won the Ropin Dreams Xtreme Bulls in Pleasanton, Texas; He won the Durant, Oklahoma Pro Rodeo; He won the Pioneer Days rodeo in Ogden, Utah; He won the Kansas' Biggest Rodeo in Phillipsburg, Kansas; He won the Hells A Roarin Xtreme Bulls & Broncs Riding in Gardiner, Montana and he won the Yellowstone River Round-Up in Billings, Montana. He was co-champion of the Dinosaur Roundup Rodeo in Vernal, Utah and co-champion at the Mustard Seeds Xtreme Bulls in Mitchell, South Dakota.

Preparing for his goal of winning his 7th world championship upon entering the NFR, Kimzey said, "Still have to kind of pinch myself" entering the National Finals Rodeo. Kimzey was one title away from tying Jim Shoulders and two titles away from tying Don Gay with eight titles. Kimzey was currently in the No. 1 spot. He competed at all rodeo events as a child. Bull riding was his favorite and most successful event. He had won over $2.5 million and six straight world titles between 2014 and 2019. "I still have to kind of pinch myself, honestly," Kimzey said when asked about that impenetrable run. "You know, my motivation has changed a lot. I don't know that I have anything to prove anymore," he said. He was also considering going over to the Professional Bull Riders (PBR). "There are some benefits that way. We'll have to wait and see."

2022 season 
In February, Kimzey had a busy two weeks in Fort Worth, Texas. On the 7th, Kimzey won the title at the Fort Worth Stock Show and Rodeo with a 91.5-point ride on 4L & Diamond Rodeo's bull Space Unicorn. The win at Fort Worth put him inside the top 5 in the world standings. Then, there was the birth of his son. He was where he needed to be after missing a few rodeos due to the birth. Later that month, Kimzey won the San Antonio Stock Show & Rodeo in San Antonio, Texas, and in May, the Cactus Jack Xtreme Bull Riding in Uvalde, Texas.

On June 10, Kimzey was bucked off by Pete Carr Pro Rodeo's Severe Weather at the Parker County Sheriff Posse's Frontier Days and PRCA Rodeo in Weatherford, Texas. During the ride, his left shoulder (free arm) popped out. It was the same shoulder he dislocated while riding bulls in high school and that had been bothering him for over a decade. After getting examined, in addition to his dislocated left shoulder, Kimzey found out he had multiple tears in his labrum, a totally torn supraspinatus, a displaced bicep tendon, a broken collarbone, and some rotator cuff damage (all on his left side). He figured it was a culmination of his bull riding wrecks from high school. He also learned that his injuries required surgery that would force him to miss the rest of the 2022 season. Kimzey was third in the PRCA world standings at the time of his injuries.

While recovering from surgery, Kimzey was a color commentator during the inaugural season of the PBR's Team Series. When the PRCA regular season had concluded, Kimzey finished inside the top 15 bull riders who qualified for the NFR. However, he was unable to compete at the event due to his post-surgery recovery timetable not allowing it.

2023 season 
Kimzey was a color commentator during the first few events of the 2023 PBR Unleash the Beast Series season while still recovering from surgery.

He returned to competition during the Fort Worth Stock Show & Rodeo's Xtreme Bulls event on January 17–18 where he rode Big Rafter Rodeo's Trunk Money for 89.5 points in Round 1. Kimzey would end up finishing the event in fourth place.

Summary
Kimzey's PRCA career earnings are almost at $3 million. He has qualified for the NFR eight times from 2014, 2015, 2016, 2017, 2018, 2019, 2020, and 2021 and won seven PRCA bull riding world titles from 2014, 2015, 2016, 2017, 2018, 2019, and 2021. He has also won three NFR bull riding average titles in 2014, 2017, and 2019. In 2016, at age 22 during the NFR, he became the youngest millionaire in PRCA history.

Awards 

2014 Professional Rodeo Cowboys Association (PRCA) Bull Riding Rookie of the Year*later became a world champion
2014 PRCA Ram Top Gun Award winner
2014, 2016, 2017 Championship Bull Riding (CBR) World Champion
2014, 2017, 2019 National Finals Rodeo (NFR) Bull Riding Average champion
2014-2019, 2021 PRCA World Champion bull rider
2015, 2017, 2019 Calgary Stampede bull riding champion
2015, 2017–2019, 2021 PRCA Xtreme Bulls Tour Champion
2017, 2020 The American Rodeo bull riding champion (champion in 2017, co-champion in 2020 with João Ricardo Vieira)

Career milestones
2013 College National Finals Rodeo (CNFR) qualifier 
8-time National Finals Rodeo (NFR) qualifier (2014-2021) 
5-time CBR World Finals qualifier (2014-2018) 
2017 Professional Bull Riders (PBR) Velocity Tour Finals invitee and event champion 
2017 PBR World Finals wild card qualifier via winning the Velocity Tour Finals
Member of Team USA Eagles during the 2019 PBR Global Cup 
Member of Team Cooper Tires, champions of the 2020 PBR Monster Energy Team Challenge

Personal
Kimzey is married to his longtime girlfriend, Alexis Bloomer. They reside in Salado, Texas. After ten years as friends, then dating, then engagement, they got married on October 9, 2020, in Little Elm, Texas. On January 25, 2022, the Kimzeys had their first child, a boy.

References

Sources

External links
 Sage Kimzey 7 time world champion
 Sage Kimzey | 2021 NFR Round 10
 GOING 90: Sage Steele Kimzey Wins $100,000 With a 92.5 Point Ride | 2019

1994 births
Living people
People from Roger Mills County, Oklahoma
Bull riders